St Mary's Church, Rosliston is a Grade II* listed parish church in the Church of England in Rosliston, Derbyshire.

History

The church dates from the 14th century. It was restored in 1802 and the nave and chancel were built in 1819.

The parish achieved notoriety in 1892 when the Revd. John Vallancy, vicar of Rosliston took two members of his congregation to court for interrupting the service. The case at Swadlincote Petty Sessions was thrown out by the magistrates. Two years later he appeared in Burton County court in an action against one of his parishioners, as he disagreed with her habit of placing flowers on her sister's grave. He lost the case and was ordered to pay the defendant's costs. On 18 August 1896 he appeared again at Swadlincote Petty Sessions accused of threatening to shoot a visitor by the name of Wright. He was found guilty and fined 20s. This series of offences resulted in him appearing at a Consistory Court in 1897 where he was charged by the Bishop of Southwell under the Clergy Discipline Act of 1892. The Bishop suspended him for 18 months.

Organ
 
A specification of the organ can be found on the National Pipe Organ Register.

Parish status

The church is in a joint parish with
St Mary's Church, Coton in the Elms
St John the Baptist's Church, Croxall cum Oakley
St Nicholas and the Blessed Virgin Mary's Church, Croxall cum Oakley
All Saints' Church, Lullington
St Peter's Church, Netherseal
St Lawrence's Church, Walton-on-Trent
St Matthew's Church, Overseal

References

Church of England church buildings in Derbyshire
Grade II* listed churches in Derbyshire